Yunkeracarus is a genus of mites belonging to the family Gastronyssidae. They live exclusively in the nostrils of rodents. Females can be recognized by the small transparent scales covering the body, males by the lack of copulatory suckers.

References
The occurrence of the genus Yunkeracarus in North America (Acarina: Epidermoptidae). Kerwin E. Hyland Jr & David T. Clark. Acarologia vol I

Sarcoptiformes
Parasites of rodents
Arachnids of North America